Georgiasaurus ("Georgy's lizard"; after V. A. Otschev's father, Georgy Otschev, a geodesist who died shortly before Otschev published the description in 1976) is an extinct genus of plesiosaur from the Late Cretaceous of Russia. Otschev (or Ochev) originally named the specimen Georgia, but that name was preoccupied (Baird & Girrard, 1853). Originally a complete skeleton, the specimen was damaged in preparation of the quarry stone.

See also

 List of plesiosaur genera
 Timeline of plesiosaur research

References

Late Cretaceous plesiosaurs
Fossils of Russia
Fossil taxa described in 1997
Sauropterygian genera